Mya Thaung (born 1943) is a Burmese painter. Born in Bogalay, he studied at the State School of Fine Art in Yangon from 1965 to 1967. He has showcased his works all over the Asia Pacific region, Korea, Japan, Singapore, Australia etc. In 1990 he entered a Water Color Contest in New York City and won first prize. In September–October 1992, his paintings appeared in the Arts of Asia Magazine.

References

Burmese painters
1943 births
Living people
People from Ayeyarwady Region